Minit Mart LLC is a chain of convenience stores operating in South central and Western Kentucky, Northern middle Tennessee, Eastern Wisconsin, Kansas City, Northeast Illinois, and Northeast Ohio. Its corporate offices are located in Cincinnati, OH, and the chain consists of 231 locations scattered around the United States.

History

The early days
In 1967, Fred Higgins, and his father, Ralph, founded a convenience store, known by the name of Minit Mart. By the time Fred graduated from the law school at the University of Kentucky in the spring of 1969, he expanded the operation to a chain of six locations in the metro Lexington area.

Fred Higgins served in the U.S. Army in the time between 1969 and 1972. When he returned in 1972, Minit Mart Foods became incorporated with 16 locations. After that time, Fred began acquiring single convenience stores and select sites on which to build new locations across Kentucky.

During the 1970s, Minit Mart became one of the first convenience store chains to add gas pumps to their locations. an innovation that has changed the way Americans buy gasoline for their transportation vehicles. Marathon brand gasoline has been part of Minit Mart's offered services since then. Minit Mart has been at the forefront of adding delis and game machines during the same decade. Minit Mart started offering videotaped movie rentals when the VHS format gained popularity in the very late 1970s and early 1980s after it beat out the Betamax videocassette format. DVD movie rentals began to be utilized by Minit Mart around the dawn of the then-new millennium around the year 2000.

Ralph Higgins, the co-founder, played an active role in the management of Minit Mart Foods Inc until his 1987 death.

Expansion into Tennessee
Minit Mart began to expand in Tennessee in 1988 after acquiring 19 Bread Box convenience stores. After that point, Minit Mart had 87 stores in Kentucky and Tennessee. Many locations included Godfather's Pizza, O'Deli's, Baskin-Robbins Ice Cream, and Taco Bell Express, thereby grossing $250 million each year, and employing exactly 1,200 people.

Operation changes
In 1998, Fred lost his 25-year-long-time wife to a battle of cancer she was fighting since the diagnosis in 1978. After the loss of his wife, he and the management team thought that it was time that the convenience store chain is in for a change. In 2001, Minit Mart Foods leased its operations to Clark Retail, retaining ownership of the assets. In addition to Clark's original 600 stores, that company also acquired several other chains in the Midwestern United States, mainly in Indiana and Illinois, growing to approximately 1,200 stores. Competition, however, was intense during that time, and Clark eventually ended up in bankruptcy. After filing for bankruptcy, Clark returned 37 stores to Minit Mart Foods Inc.

Fred's Minit Mart LLC had taken over the operation in August 2003. A management team was formed, and 34 locations remained in operation.

Current slate and recent history
In the present day, Minit Mart operates 34 locations. Most of them are in Kentucky, but there are two locations operating in Clarksville, Montgomery County, Tennessee, and one in the Cookeville, Tennessee area. All locations are combinations of convenience and grocery shopping, and for many years, feature Marathon Gasoline. Godfather's Pizza and O'Deli's sub shops continued to be offered in most locations. In addition to those two, most Minit Mart locations also offer World Blends fresh coffee (formerly CuppaJoe), and Minit Mix.

In 2007, Minit Mart really had the business boost of the store's life when customers took advantage of Godfather's Pizza Large 1-topping pizza that went for $5.00 that summer (later $5.99 in late 2007, and then $7.99 between Spring 2008 and Summer 2010). Regular prices returned in 2009.

In 2008, Minit Mart introduced Minit Mix, a fountain drink that allows customers to create a soft drink mixed with certain flavors, including vanilla, cherry, and several others. It's a similar service to Coca-Cola's Freestyle machines that were introduced in certain fast food chains several years later.

Beginning in 2012, all Minit Mart locations added ATM kiosks without service charges.

During the early 2010s, Minit Mart renovated their location in Glasgow.

Also in the early 2010s, a new building was built to house the Minit Mart location in Brownsville just a couple hundred feet from the original location. The old building was destroyed a few weeks after the completion and official opening of the new present building due to old age. The destruction of the old building made way for a larger parking lot, a few more entrances, and more fuel pumps.

In 2015, Fred Higgins sold the Minit Mart convenience store chain to TravelCenters of America for $67 million. In January 2015, Minit Mart purchased additional stores and rebranded them, including a few in the Jackson Purchase region of western Kentucky, including one in Paducah, and one in Centerville, Indiana.

In late March 2016 TCA closed on the purchase of Quality State Oil's "QMart Marketplace" 17-store chain of convenience stores based in Sheboygan, Wisconsin, which were immediately converted into Minit Mart locations. The acquisition was done mainly to acquire the technology and patents for QSO's convenience store industry award-winning RFID keychain card-based loyalty program.

Pizza sales
According to Minit Mart's Facebook post on June 17, 2015, two Godfather's Pizza locations within the Minit Mart chain has been listed as the first and second place in terms of pizza sales. The location in Brownsville (Edmonson County) had the highest sales of any non-traditional location in the entire Godfather's Pizza chain nationwide, with one of Minit Mart's Bowling Green locations taking second place.

Competition in the region
Minit Mart's main competitors include Jr. Food Stores and Crossroads IGA locations. Both of those chains are owned by Houchens Industries, which also owns their flagship supermarket chain, Houchens Markets, and several IGA Foodliner stores in south central Kentucky. Minit Mart's other competitors include several locally owned convenience stores around southern Kentucky, some of which offer pizza and/or fried chicken, as well as some Speedway locations. Phillips 66-branded stores under the name "Traveler's Food Plaza" in areas around Glasgow, Edmonton, and Tompkinsville, Kentucky also competed with Minit Mart for quite some time. Gas stations offering rival branded gasoline also often competed with Minit Mart for consumer allegiances. In the eastern Wisconsin market, Minit Mart's main competitor is Kwik Trip.

Key Dates
1967: Fred and Ralph Higgins, a father-and-son duo founded a convenience store in Lexington, Kentucky under the name of "Minit Mart".  
1969: Minit Mart expands to six locations around the Lexington area. 
1970s: Minit Mart began offering Marathon gasoline. 
Late 1970s: Delis and game machines were added. 
Sometime between 1978 and 1983: Videotape rentals were first offered. 
Mid 1980s?: Godfather's Pizza became part of Minit Mart's offered services. 
1988: Minit Mart expands to Tennessee after acquiring Bread Box stores in certain parts of that state. 
1999-2000: DVD rentals were offered in tandem with VHS movie rentals. 
2001: Clark Retail leased Minit Mart's operations.
Unknown date: Minit Mart launches their website.  
2003: Clark Retail went bankrupt, and 37 Minit Mart stores were returned to Fred's Minit Mart LLC. 
January 2008: Earnhardt + Friends had been chosen for the advertising firm of Minit Mart. Both companies experienced growth as a result. It spawned plans to rebuild locations in Harrodsburg and Nicholasville, Kentucky to be rebuilt to add the two food service additions to those  locations. 
2008: Minit Mart introduces Minit Mix.
2008: Minit Mart was named Convenience Store of The year by the Kentucky Association of Convenience stores.
2011: Fred Higgins, the founder, was inducted in the Kentucky Grocers Association's Hall of Fame.
2013: The convenience store chain was sold to Travel Centers of America, Inc.
2015: Bought 19 stores from bankrupt GasMart USA based in Overland Park, Kansas. These 19 stores are C-Stores in Kansas and Missouri.
2016: Minit Mart enters Kansas City market with re-branding of 59 convenience stores, including convenience stores in Shawnee and De Soto.
2016: The Minit Mart brand came to several Shell stations in the Lexington area, mainly those with World Blends Coffee.

Community Support
In March 2014, Minit Mart raised almost $43,000 USD from employees and their customers to the MDA, the Muscular Dystrophy Association, during their annual shamrock fundraising campaign they conduct each year. Paper shamrocks were handed to all employees and customers that give a donation, and write their name on them, and display them on the window of the stores. This takes place around St. Patrick's Day, and this fundraiser helps MDA assist people with the disease.

See also
Godfather's Pizza

References

External links
Minit Mart's Official Website
Godfather's Pizza
Minit Mart on Social Media
Promotions and Coupons
Minit Mart Locations list
Minit Mart - YouTube
Minit Mart on Facebook

Convenience stores of the United States
American companies established in 1967
Retail companies established in 1967
Energy companies established in 1967
Non-renewable resource companies established in 1967
Gas stations in the United States
Companies that filed for Chapter 11 bankruptcy in 2003
2018 mergers and acquisitions